Batrachorhina induta is a species of beetle in the family Cerambycidae. It was described by Léon Fairmaire in 1902. It is known from Madagascar.

References

Batrachorhina
Beetles described in 1902